The National College of Home Economics is a constituent college of the University of Dhaka, directed by the governing body of Dhaka University. The Faculty of Biological Science of the University of Dhaka directly monitors all academic activities of the college. It was founded in 1998. It is an all girls' college.

Courses
 Level of education is B.Sc (Hons.) & M.S.
 Medium of education is Bengali & English
 No. of Honours Department 05

Departments
There are five departments:

 Food and Nutrition
 Resource management and Entrepreneurship
 Child Development and Social Relationship
 Art & Creative Studies
 Clothing and Textile

Admission
B.Sc: Admission test is conducted by Faculty of Biological Science of University of Dhaka. Students give separate admission test for Home Economics Unit. 550 students can get admitted each year for B.Sc Course in this college.

Campus
Campus is situated At 3/9-B, Block-B, Lalmatia, Dhaka-1207.

References

University of Dhaka
Home economics education
Vocational education in Bangladesh